Philobota is a genus of concealer moths in the family Oecophoridae erected by Edward Meyrick in 1883. There are more than 200 described species in Philobota. They are found predominantly in Australia.

See also
 List of Philobota species

References

External links

 

Oecophoridae